Gilakeran (also, Gelakeran, Geliakeran, and Gilekeran) is a village in the Astara Rayon of Azerbaijan.

References 

Populated places in Astara District